Dance for Me is a remix album by American recording artist Mary J. Blige. Released in the United States on August 13, 2002 by MCA Records, the album contains remixes from her previously released three albums Share My World (1997), Mary (1999) and No More Drama (2001). Named after Blige's same-titled 2002 single, it includes rare dance remixes, produced by Al B. Rich, Curtis Moore, Hex Hector, Junior Vasquez, and Thunderpuss.

Following its release, the album reached number 36 on the US Top R&B/Hip Hop Albums chart and entered the lower half of the Billboard 200. AllMusic declaring Dance for Me "the best, most innovative remix albums of recent vintage."

Track listing

Charts

Weekly charts

Year-end charts

References 

Mary J. Blige albums
2002 remix albums